Ceilidh  was a Canadian music television series which aired on CBC Television in 1973 and 1974.

Premise
This series began as a local 13-episode production which was broadcast locally in mid-1973 and hosted by John Allan Cameron. Its title (céilidh) is a Gaelic word meaning a social gathering based on dancing and music.

In 1974, the series was produced in Halifax for CBC's national network. Cameron was replaced by Alasdair Gillies who joined series regulars the Cape Breton Fiddlers and the Ceilidh Dancers.

Scheduling
This half-hour series was broadcast on the CBC network Thursdays at 8:30 p.m. (Eastern) from 16 May 1974.

References

External links
 

CBC Television original programming
1973 Canadian television series debuts
1974 Canadian television series endings
Television shows filmed in Halifax, Nova Scotia